Joep van Liefland (born 1966 in Utrecht) is a contemporary conceptual artist from Netherlands. He lives and works in Berlin. 

His work focuses on the phenomenology of media and their transformation. He is particularly interested in the matter of impermanence and disappearance that are closely connected to the technological progress. Using the example of technology, Joep van Liefland addresses the process of alteration and transformation as well as the universal concepts that underlie the transition from old to new.

For his art pieces, Joep van Liefland uses various outdated distribution and storage devices. He arranges them into space-filling installations, as in the work series „VIDEO PALACE“, or uses them to create sculptures, wall objects, screen prints, and collages.

Since 2001, Joep van Liefland runs, together with Maik Schierloh, the art space AUTOCENTER in Berlin where international art positions are presented regularly.

Selected solo exhibitions 
 2015 True RGB, Galerie Gebr. Lehmann, Dresden
 2015 Men in Pain, Ramiken Crucible, New York
 2014 abc - art berlin contemporary 2014
 2014 Video Palace #37 – MANIAC, Museum Goch, Goch
 2013 Traces, Galerie Gebr. Lehmann, Berlin
 2013 Expired, Galerie Parisa Kind, Frankfurt am Main
 2011 Metaphysics 2 E 56, Galerie Gebr. Lehmann, Dresden
 2011 White Noise and Reverberation (mit Bernhard Schreiner), Kunstverein Augsburg
 2011 Video Palace #33 – Living Dead 1264, Galerie Kai Erdmann, Hamburg
 2010 Black Systems (Extended Version), Stedelijk Museum Büro Amsterdam, Amsterdam
 2009 Video Palace 28 – Afterlife, AMP Gallery, Athen
 2008 Video Palace #26 – Black Hole of Entertainment, Galerie Layr Wuestenhagen, Vienna
 2007 Video Palace #23 – Hollywood was yesterday, L’Atelier-Galerie Jean Brolly, Paris

Selected group exhibitions 
2014 Daily Memories, Kloster Unser Lieben Frauen, Magdeburg
2014 Unendlicher Spass, Schirn Kunsthalle Frankfurt
2013 Oranje, Schlifka/Molina, Buenos Aires
2013 Analogital, Utah Museum of Contemporary Art, Salt Lake City
2012 The Garden of Eden, Palais de Tokyo, Paris
2011 Redefine:Readymade, Kunstverein, Schwerin
2010 Schwarz, Märkisches Museum Witten
2009 Wach sind nur die Geister, HMKV Hartware MedienKunstVerein, Dortmund

References
 
 Joep van Liefland: Traces, Essay von Dr. Jennifer Allen, Hrsg. v. Galerie Gebr. Lehmann, 2013
 Joep van Liefland, Hrsg. v. AMP Gallery, Athen, 2009

External links 
 joepvanliefland.com
 Joep van Liefland bei der Galerie Gebr. Lehmann
 AUTOCENTER Berlin
 Interview mit dem Künstler im Schirn Magazin

1966 births
Living people
Dutch artists
Artists from Utrecht